Sengkang is an urban planning area and residential district in Singapore.

Sengkang may also refer to:

 Sengkang, Indonesia, a town in South Sulawesi, the capital of Wajo Regency
 Sengkang, Kulai, a town in Kulai district, Johor, Malaysia